Kfar HaNagid (lit. Village of the Prince), is a moshav in central Israel. Located in the coastal plain around 20 km south of Tel Aviv and north of Yavne, it falls under the jurisdiction of Gan Raveh Regional Council.

History
The moshav was established in 1949 by immigrants from Bulgaria, and it was named after Samuel HaNagid. According to Benny Morris, the moshav is founded near the land of the depopulated Palestinian  village of al-Qubayba, however, Walid Khalidi writes that it is only near the al-Qubayba site and that Kfar HaNagid is located on the land which belonged to Yibna.

References

Bulgarian-Jewish culture in Israel
Moshavim
Populated places established in 1949
Populated places in Central District (Israel)
1949 establishments in Israel